The Men's omnium competition at the 2018 UCI Track Cycling World Championships was held on 3 March 2018.

Results

Scratch race
The scratch race was started at 14:41.

Tempo race
The tempo race was started at 16:27.

Elimination race
The elimination race was started at 18:52.

Overall
After all events including points race.

References

Men's omnium
UCI Track Cycling World Championships – Men's omnium